Goodloe Edgar Byron (June 22, 1929 – October 11, 1978), a Democrat, was a U.S. Congressman who represented the 6th congressional district of Maryland from January 3, 1971, until his death from a heart attack on October 11, 1978. He was replaced as 6th district representative by his widow, Beverly Byron, in 1979.

Career
Byron attended The JAG School at the University of Virginia and entered U.S. Army JAG Corps. He served as a member of the United States Army Judge Advocate General's Corps from 1953 to 1957, honorably discharged with the rank of captain. He earned his JD from The George Washington University He later was elected to the Maryland House of Delegates (1963–1967) and the Maryland State Senate (1967–1971).

His parents, William D. Byron and Katharine Byron, both served as 6th district representative, from 1939 to 1941 and 1941 to 1943, respectively. The Byron family were communicants of Saint John's Church, Hagerstown.

Death

On October 11, 1978, Byron suffered a fatal heart attack while he was jogging with an aide alongside the Chesapeake and Ohio Canal in western Maryland.  He was 49 years old.  Byron was buried in the Antietam National Cemetery in Sharpsburg, Maryland.

Byron was intrigued by the now widely discredited claim of Thomas J. Bassler, MD that nonsmokers able to complete a marathon in under four hours can eat whatever they wish and never suffer a fatal heart attack.

According to nutritionist and longevity research pioneer Nathan Pritikin, Byron had run six Boston Marathons, with a best time of 3:28:40, and had not smoked for 25 years. He ignored warnings from his physician who told him that treadmill tests from 1974 to 1978 indicated his coronary arteries were gradually closing. The last treadmill test in January 1978 "indicated severe abnormality and was positive for heart disease." The physician advised Byron to stop running until further tests could be done.

Dr. Manuel G. Jimenez, who did the autopsy, said Byron had “only pinprick openings” in his coronary arteries because they were filled with cholesterol. “Congressman Byron's coronary arteries were worse than most I've autopsied.”

See also
 List of United States Congress members who died in office (1950–99)

References

External links

 

1929 births
1978 deaths
20th-century American lawyers
20th-century American politicians
Byron family of Maryland
Democratic Party members of the United States House of Representatives from Maryland
George Washington University Law School alumni
United States Army Judge Advocate General's Corps
Maryland lawyers
Democratic Party Maryland state senators
Democratic Party members of the Maryland House of Delegates
Military personnel from Maryland
People from Williamsport, Maryland
Politicians from Frederick, Maryland
Politicians from Hagerstown, Maryland
United States Army officers
University of Virginia alumni